Indotyphlops tenuicollis, the Samagutin worm snake, is a harmless blind snake species found in northern India. No subspecies are currently recognized.

Geographic range
Definitely only known from Nagaland in northern India. The type locality given is "angelich aus dem Himalaya" (Himalayas).

References

Further reading

 Boulenger GA. 1893. Catalogue of the snakes in the British Museum (Nat. Hist.) I. London (Taylor & Francis), 448 pp.
 Peters W. 1864. Über neue Amphibien (Typhloscincus, Typhlops, Asthenodipsas, Ogmodon). Mber. k. preuss. Akad. Wiss., Berlin: 271-276.
 Stoliczka F. 1871. Notes on some Indian and Burmese Ophidians. J. asiat. Soc. Bengal, Calcutta, 40: 421-445
 Theobald, W. 1876 Descriptive catalogue of the reptiles of British India. Thacker, Spink & Co., Calcutta: xiii + 238 pp.

External links
 

tenuicollis
Reptiles of India
Reptiles described in 1864
Taxa named by Wilhelm Peters